Confédération générale des travailleurs tunisiens ('General Confederation of Tunisian Workers', abbreviated CGTT) was a central trade union organisation in Tunisia. Founded in 1924, it was the first Tunisian trade union central. However, the French colonial authorities soon clamped down on the organization. Several of its leaders were arrested. Six of them, including Mohammad Ali, were put on trial in November 1925 and deported from the country. Soon thereafter, CGTT was dissolved.

References

Defunct trade unions of Tunisia
Trade unions established in 1924
1924 establishments in Tunisia